The Brewer School is a historic school building on Brewer Road in Brewer, Arkansas. It is a vernacular single-story wood-frame structure, with a hip roof, weatherboard siding, and a stone foundation. A shed-roof porch shelters the entrance, and a belfry projects from the front slope of the roof. The school was built in 1910, and served as a one-room schoolhouse until 1950. It is still used as a community meeting and polling place.

The building was listed on the National Register of Historic Places in 2004.

See also
National Register of Historic Places listings in Cleburne County, Arkansas

References

School buildings on the National Register of Historic Places in Arkansas
One-room schoolhouses in Arkansas
Buildings and structures in Cleburne County, Arkansas
National Register of Historic Places in Cleburne County, Arkansas
School buildings completed in 1910